Nothing but Trouble is a 1991 American comedy horror film directed by Dan Aykroyd in his directorial debut, and written by Aykroyd, based on a story by his brother Peter. Chevy Chase and Demi Moore star as yuppies who are taken to court for speeding in the bizarre, financially bankrupt small town of Valkenvania. Aykroyd co-stars as the town's 106-year-old judge, Alvin Valkenheiser, who holds a personal grudge against financiers, and John Candy has a supporting role as Valkenheiser's grandson, chief of police Dennis Valkenheiser. Tupac Shakur made his acting debut in this film, as a member of the rap group Digital Underground. The film's tone was compared by critics to films such as Abbott and Costello Meet Frankenstein, Psycho, The Texas Chainsaw Massacre series and The Rocky Horror Picture Show, as well as The Munsters. The film's humor was described as being derived from sketch comedy and gross-out humor.

Production commenced in 1990 under the title Git, which was changed in production to Valkenvania. Subsequently, prior to the film's release, Warner Bros. changed the title to Nothing but Trouble; in a press statement released in December 1990, Aykroyd said that he preferred the Valkenvania title. Upon release, the film received generally negative reviews from critics, with criticism directed at its humor, screenplay, tone, and direction. Aykroyd would go on to receive a Worst Supporting Actor Razzie at the 12th Golden Raspberry Awards.

Plot 
While hosting a party in his Manhattan penthouse, financial publisher Chris Thorne (Chevy Chase) meets lawyer Diane Lightson (Demi Moore) and agrees to escort her to consult a client in Atlantic City the following day. Thorne's clients, obnoxious but wealthy Brazilian siblings Fausto and Renalda Squiriniszu (Taylor Negron and Bertila Damas), meet up with them and invite themselves along. Chris takes a detour off of the New Jersey Turnpike, ultimately ending up in the run-down village of Valkenvania. After running a stop sign and subsequently attempting to escape pursuing officer Dennis Valkenheiser (John Candy), the group is captured and taken before his 106-year-old grandfather Judge Alvin Valkenheiser (Dan Aykroyd). After Chris offends the judge, the yuppies are locked in a hidden room under the courthouse to be judged the next day, and they overhear the judge violently executing a group of convicted drug dealers in a deadly roller coaster nicknamed "Mr. Bonestripper". Chris, Diane and the Brazilians attend the judge's dinner, learning that the Judge is holding them there as retribution for a coal deal which the Valkenheiser family blames for their poverty. The group attempts an escape, but Alvin's mute granddaughter Eldona (Candy, in a dual role) captures Chris and Diane. Meanwhile, after being chased by Dennis' trigger-happy cousin, Miss Purdah, the Brazilians escape by cutting a deal with Dennis, who decides to escape with them.

The Judge holds Chris and Diane hostage, but they eventually escape, get lost through hidden hallways and slides and become separated. Escaping into the property's salvage yard, Diane meets and befriends the judge's severely deformed grandchildren, Bobo (played by Aykroyd) and Lil' Debbull (played by John Daveikis), who are barred from living in the house. However, she also notices Eldona destroying Chris's BMW 733i. The Judge catches Chris sneaking into his personal quarters and punishes him per house policy, which decrees that Chris must marry Eldona. Meanwhile, in the court room, Digital Underground is being held on charges of speeding, but the Judge releases them after being charmed by an impromptu rap performance. He also asks them to stay as witnesses for the wedding, which Chris reluctantly goes through with in exchange for his life, but is later caught pleading with the band to help him escape. The band leaves without understanding him, and the Judge furiously sentences Chris to die in "Mr. Bonestripper". The machine breaks down just before Chris is fed into it, and he escapes. The Judge nearly kills Diane with another claw contraption known as the Gradertine, but Chris retrieves her at the last second and the two jump on a freight train back to New York. After the two report their plight to the authorities, local and state police raid the Judge's courthouse. Chris and Diane are asked to accompany the officers to the site, only to find out that the officers involved are fully aware of and allied with the Judge. The couple escapes when the area's underground coal fires cause a colossal earthquake, fatally destroying the town. Back in New York, Chris sees the judge on television, brandishing Chris's driver's license, announcing that he and his family plan to move in with his new grandson-in-law, causing Chris to comically flee for his life.

Cast

Style and interpretation 
Entertainment Weekly, Vibe and Den of Geek described the film as a horror comedy. The Los Angeles Times critic Peter Rainer wrote, "The intention seems to be a slap-happy cross between Psycho and Abbott and Costello Meet Frankenstein". Lou Cedrone, writing for the Baltimore Sun, said that the film "plays like a comedy version of the Texas Chainsaw Massacre films." Candice Russel, writing for the Sun-Sentinel, called Nothing but Trouble a "variation on The Rocky Horror Picture Show". The film's humor was described by critics as deriving from gross-out humor and sketch comedy. Nathan Rabin interpreted the film's plot as "[tapping] into a fear common among wealthy Manhattan yuppies: that once they leave the cozy confines of the five boroughs, inbred hillbillies will try to kill them for being wealthy Manhattan yuppies."

Production

The story was developed after a screening of the 1987 film Hellraiser that producer Robert K. Weiss attended with Dan and Peter Aykroyd. Weiss had a fractured rib and suggested the three attend a film to take his mind off his injury, but that it couldn't be a comedy because it hurt him to laugh, which is why the Aykroyd brothers chose a horror film. Once the movie started and the three saw the audience laughing at the film, Weiss suggested that they make a horror-comedy together, since audiences wanted to laugh and be scared at the same time. Peter Aykroyd related an event in which Dan had been pulled over for speeding in upstate New York and was taken to the justice of the peace to stand trial in what Dan referred to as a "kangaroo court", and after he was fined $50, the justice of the peace invited Dan to stay for tea, and he ended up staying there for four hours. It was suggested that a horror story be developed based on this event, and Aykroyd spent 6 months writing it as a screenplay titled Git, which was later changed to Road to Ruin; Dan Aykroyd described the script as "a monster movie" and compared it to Beetlejuice and The Texas Chain Saw Massacre. Much of the script's bizarre characters and events, such as the giant mutant babies, were based on a series of dreams Aykroyd was having, and he set the story in the fictional town of Valkenvania, which was based loosely on the town of Centralia, Pennsylvania.

Aykroyd offered the script to John Hughes, who was interested in the story, but ultimately turned it down because he only directed his own scripts. John Landis disliked the script and immediately turned it down. The script caught the attention of Warner Bros., who wanted John Candy to costar. Aykroyd wanted to play the parts of Judge Valkenheiser and Chris Thorne,  but the studio wanted Chevy Chase to play Thorne, and Aykroyd agreed. With no director attached, Aykroyd said he would direct the film to secure the deal, even though he didn't want to direct the film. Aykroyd later agreed to play the giant adult baby Bobo as well, after no one else wanted to play the part, and found it stressful to play two parts in heavy makeup while simultaneously directing and producing. Warner Bros. had faith in Aykroyd, and gave him a $40 million budget.

The film commenced production on May 7, 1990 in Los Angeles, California, under the title Trickhouse.

On July 12, the title was changed to Valkenvania, and a release date was scheduled for Christmas 1990. The "Valkenheiser" mansion, Town Hall, and other environments were constructed on two soundstages at Warner Bros. Studios; one of the set pieces, dubbed "Autohenge", was a garden constructed of scrap metal. Designer William Sandell was inspired by his previous experience as a kinetic sculptor. The production designers acquired props and decorations from “every prop resource in town,” as well as Aykroyd's personal collection.

The Greystone Mansion in Los Angeles was used to shoot the scenes depicting Chris Thorne's New York City apartment. Exteriors were also shot in the Lehigh Valley, 60 miles North of Philadelphia; second-unit photography occurred in Pennsylvania, New Jersey and New York City.

The film went $5 million over budget.

Soundtrack 

Nothing but Trouble (Music from the Motion Picture Soundtrack) was released in 1991 through Warner Bros. Records. It is composed of ten songs.

Other songs
There are four additional songs that appeared in the film but were not released on the soundtrack album:
"A Garden in the Rain" performed by Blue Barron
"She's a Great, Great Girl" performed by Jack Teagarden
"Wabash Cannonball" performed by Doc Watson
"Helen Claire" performed by Michael Kamen

Release 

In December 1990, Warner Bros. changed the film's title to Nothing but Trouble. On December 20, Dan Aykroyd stated in a press release that he would always think of the film as Valkenvania. A promotional illustration by Boris Vallejo was commissioned in 1991. The film's release was delayed to recut the film for a PG-13 rating, removing the film's over the top violence, and the studio rescheduled The Bonfire of the Vanities to the Christmas 1990 release date originally held by Nothing but Trouble.

The film was released on February 15, 1991. According to Box Office Mojo, the film opened at #8 in 1,671 theaters, grossing $3,966,240 opening weekend. The site lists its total gross upon completed release as $8,479,793, with a 50.5% drop-off in its second week of release. In 1992, at the 12th Golden Raspberry Awards, Aykroyd received a Worst Supporting Actor Razzie. It also took home Worst Picture at the 1991 Stinkers Bad Movie Awards. Chevy Chase later expressed dislike for the film, saying he only accepted the role of Chris Thorne because of his friendship with Aykroyd.

Critical reception
Nothing but Trouble was negatively received by critics. Chris Hicks, writing for the Deseret News wrote, "though Aykroyd seems to be having the time of his life as the judge, Chase, Candy, and Moore appear much less animated than usual [and] downright embarrassed in some scenes". Writing for The New York Times, Vincent Canby criticized Aykroyd's script, believing its narrative had "loose ends", and said "the movie looks less funny than expensive". The Hollywood Reporter criticized the film's comedy, considering it to be "skit-level". The Los Angeles Times critic Peter Rainer wrote, "if you're in the mood to be clobbered with stale jokes, it might seem fitfully amusing. Occasionally, the talents of the cast burn through the haze of misfires and remembered routines".

Lou Cedrone, writing for the Baltimore Sun, said that "if there is a laugh here, it goes by unnoticed". Chicago Tribune critic Dave Kehr wrote that "Valkenvania bids fair to become one of the legendary disasters of the movie business, a movie so unfunny, so distasteful and so painful to watch that you can't take your eyes off it". Jay Boyar, writing for the Orlando Sentinel wrote: "The problem is that the neophyte director appears to believe that being gross, in itself, is enough. Even John Waters, in his Pink Flamingos period, realized that wit was also necessary. Besides, Waters was genuinely outrageous in a startlingly original way. The grotesquerie of Aykroyd's film reminded me of a disturbed child trying to gross out a friend on the playground." Candice Russel, writing for the Sun-Sentinel, wrote that "this mean-spirited effort by Aykroyd proves that he cannot write an effective comedy; if he's acting, he should leave the direction to someone else". Washington Post writer Hal Hinson called the film "nothing but trouble and agony and pain and suffering and obnoxious, toxically unfunny bad taste; it's nothing but miserable".

Entertainment Weekly critic Michael Sauter wrote: "[Aykroyd and Candy] generate approximately four laughs. Chase adds maybe two. In movie-ticket terms, that's less than one laugh per dollar; as a video rental, it's a slightly better deal." The same publication printed a second review by Owen Gleiberman, writing: "Most of the jokes are so lame that Chevy Chase can't even be bothered to look nonchalant. A sadder excuse for a movie would be hard to imagine." Writing for People, Ralph Novak wrote that "after a few minutes, it's clear that this comedy is not enigmatic—just hopelessly confused". Empire writer Jo Berry wrote: "Unfortunately this isn't even half as fun as the shortest bumper-car ride, with the cast lost in a sea of unfunny situations and badly executed antique jokes on loan from The Munsters all obviously puzzled about why they are actually there." A staff review in Variety opined, "it's a good bet a film is in trouble when the highlight comes from seeing John Candy in drag"; while TV Guide stated, "Aykroyd's film has a relentless imbecility that allows it to stand with films such as Bela Lugosi Meets a Brooklyn Gorilla, John Goldfarb, Please Come Home! and Which Way to the Front? as one of the worst attempts at comedy ever filmed". Roger Ebert famously hated Nothing But Trouble so much that he refused to write a review for it after giving the movie an emphatic "Thumbs Down" and actually wanted a few noisy teenagers to make even more noise so he wouldn't hear any more of the movie while watching it in the theater auditorium. His At the Movies partner, Gene Siskel, also gave the film an emphatic "Thumbs Down" on their "At the Movies" program.

On Rotten Tomatoes, the film has an approval rating of 12% based on reviews from 25 critics. The site's consensus states: "There's nothing good in Nothing But Trouble, a grotesque comedy that is more likely to make audiences ill than make them laugh". Audiences polled by CinemaScore gave the film an average grade of "D+" on an A+ to F scale. Nathan Rabin, in his My Year of Flops segment for The A.V. Club, wrote: "Aykroyd here has lovingly, meticulously created a hideous, grotesque nightmare world nobody in their right mind would want to visit the first time around, let alone return to." IGN named Nothing but Trouble as Dan Aykroyd's worst film. The film has also received praise, with Complex listing Nothing but Trouble as one of "25 Underrated 90s Comedies"; staff writer Matt Barone called it "a strangely magnetic cluster-fuck of a high-concept comedy". IFC listed Nothing but Trouble as one of "10 '90s Comedies That Really Need Sequels".

References

External links 

 
 
 
 

1991 films
1990s comedy horror films
1991 comedy films
American comedy horror films
Films directed by Dan Aykroyd
Films set in New Jersey
Warner Bros. films
1991 directorial debut films
Films with screenplays by Dan Aykroyd
Films scored by Michael Kamen
Golden Raspberry Award winning films
1990s English-language films
Films produced by Robert K. Weiss
1990s American films